The Robinson Open was a golf tournament on the PGA Tour from 1968 to 1973. It was played at the Crawford County Country Club in Robinson, Illinois.

Winners

External links
Robinson Open once drew some of golf’s big names - Part 1 of article from The Tribune Star, Terre Haute, Indiana
Memories of Robinson Open are not forgotten - Part 2 of article from The Tribune Star, Terre Haute, Indiana
Results from golfstats.com - 1970 to 1973

Former PGA Tour events
Recurring sporting events established in 1968
Recurring events disestablished in 1973
Golf in Illinois
Crawford County, Illinois